Hybrid DVD was the name for discs such as HD DVD and Blu-ray before they were released. This was started when the CEO of Sony called for a "Hybrid DVD that all DVD players can use and extend to all the beauty and surreal images of a High Definition display."

DVD